Tremellius or Tremelius may refer to:

 Tremellius Scrofa, one of several ancient Romans
 Immanuel Tremellius, scholar of the sixteenth century

Latin-language surnames